Masako Shinpo (22 January 1913 – 19 December 1995) was a Japanese track and field athlete. She competed in the women's javelin throw at the 1932 Summer Olympics.

References

1913 births
1995 deaths
Sportspeople from Nagano Prefecture
Japanese female javelin throwers
Olympic female javelin throwers
Olympic athletes of Japan
Athletes (track and field) at the 1932 Summer Olympics
Japan Championships in Athletics winners
20th-century Japanese women